The Dennis Chavez Federal Building is a high-rise federal office building and courthouse located at 500 Gold Avenue SW in Downtown Albuquerque, New Mexico. It was completed in 1965 and was built with the purpose of housing the U.S. District Court as well as offices of various federal agencies including the U.S. Postal Service, Veterans Administration, U.S. Public Health Service, U.S. Fish and Wildlife Service, and Bureau of Indian Affairs.  Originally known simply as the U.S. Courthouse and Federal Office Building, the building was renamed in honor of longtime U.S. Senator Dennis Chavez in 1976.

The Dennis Chavez Building was designed by the Albuquerque firm of Flatow, Moore, Bryan, and Fairburn, which had previously been responsible for other local highrises like the Simms Building and Bank of the West Tower. The steel-framed building is faced with polished granite, with New Mexico marble used in the ground floor lobby. Hegeman-Harris Company of New York City was the general contractor. When built, it was the third-tallest building in New Mexico after the Bank of the West Tower and the New Mexico Bank & Trust Building. It is currently the seventh-tallest building in Albuquerque.

The District Court relocated to the newly built Pete V. Domenici United States Courthouse in 1998, but the U.S. Bankruptcy Court is still housed in the Dennis Chavez Building.

See also
List of tallest buildings in Albuquerque

References

External links 

Dennis Chavez Federal Building (Emporis)

Skyscraper office buildings in Albuquerque, New Mexico
Buildings of the United States government
Federal courthouses in the United States
Government buildings completed in 1965
Office buildings completed in 1965
Modernist architecture in New Mexico
1965 establishments in New Mexico